Ontologism is a philosophical system most associated with Nicholas Malebranche (1638–1715) which maintains that God and divine ideas are the first object of our intelligence and the intuition of God the first act of our intellectual knowledge.

See also
 Antoine Arnauld
 Casimir Ubaghs

References

Bibliography
 Malebranche, Nicholas. Dialogues on Metaphysics and on Religion, trans. David Scott, ed. Nicholas Jolley. Cambridge: Cambridge University Press, 1997. 
 Malebranche, Nicholas. The Search After Truth, trans. Paul J. Olscamp, ed. Thomas Lennon. Cambridge: Cambridge University Press, 1997.

Ontology
Epistemological theories
Epistemology of religion